The JK 2500 was a prototype sports car using a Tatra engine, made in 1955. Construction and planning began in 1951. The car is named after the designer, Julius Kubinsky. The car was originally fitted with a 2500 cc Alfa-Romeo engine, but it was later replaced with an air-cooled Tatra V8 from Tatra T603. It was used for 13 or 14 years by its designer, however, it has not been seen in several decades.

References 

JK 2500